The Silence of Dean Maitland is a 1914 Australian silent film directed by Raymond Longford. It is an adaptation of the 1886 novel of the same name by Maxwell Gray which was later filmed by Ken G. Hall in 1934. It is considered a lost film.

Plot
The Reverend Dean Maitland (Harry Thomas) falls for Alma Lee (Nellie Brooks) and impregnates her, despite being engaged to another woman. Alma's father attacks Maitland and Maitland accidentally kills him in the struggle. His best friend, Dr Henry Everard (Arthur Shirley) is convicted of the crime and sentenced to twenty years in gaol. When Everard is released he comes to Maitland's church. The Dean confesses his guilt publicly and collapses and dies.

Cast
Harry Thomas as Dean Maitland
Gwil Adams as Lilian, Cyril's sister
Nellie Brooks as Alma Lee
Ada Clyde as Mrs. Lee
Jack Goodall
Rebe Grey as Marion Maitland
Charles Keegan as Cyrill
Nellie Kemberman as Cyril's mother
Lottie Lyell as Marion Everhard
James Martin as Ben Lee
Arthur Shirley	as Doctor Henry Everard
Little Tuppeny	/Ellen Blood as Everard Maitland
 Charles Villiers as Judkins

Production
The movie was based on a play adaptation of the novel which had last appeared in Sydney in the 1890s. Entirely set in England, it was shot on location in the grounds of Gladesville Mental Asylum in Sydney. Shooting took place over 21 days.

Harry Thomas, who played the leading role, was a noted elocutionist. Raymond Longford later alleged that "the Combine" refused to let him film in their Rushcutters Bay Studio.

The movie was reportedly one of the first to feature the close-up shot. However this is not true.

Release
Colin Fraser secured the Palace Theatre in Sydney for the film's release. However the Combine threatened to cancel its supply of further films to the theatre, and other theatres, if they showed the film. Despite this the film was a considerable success at the box office. It also enjoyed a popular release in the UK.

The critic from The Sydney Morning Herald said that "the picture is well taken and the various roles are cleverly portrayed." The Daily News said "the photographic and histrionic qualities of the production are excellent, the producer having not only kept closely to the text of the novel, but carefully selected his artists with a view to preserving the facial characteristics of the dramatis personae." Other reviews were positive.

Legal dispute
Longford signed a two-year contract with Fraser Film Company to write films from May 1914 at £1,000 a year. This adaptation of The Silence of Dean Maitland was the first script Longford submitted. Afterwards however Fraser elected to pull out of the contract at the suggestion of exhibitor Henry Gee of Australasian Films.  Longford tried to sue Gee for £1,000 for helping procure breach of contract but was not successful. He appealed the decision, but the court found against him again. The battle hurt Longford's career for a time – he made two short films, then had to leave for New Zealand to get finance.

References

External links
The Silence of Dean Maitland at IMDb
The Silence of Dean Maitland at AustLit
August 1915 Variety review

1914 films
Australian drama films
Australian silent feature films
Australian black-and-white films
Films directed by Raymond Longford
Films based on British novels
Australian films based on plays
Films based on adaptations
Lost Australian films
1914 drama films
1914 lost films
Lost drama films
Silent drama films